Chuneola is a genus of crustaceans belonging to the monotypic family Chuneolidae.

The species of this genus are found in southernmost Southern Hemisphere.

Species:

Chuneola major 
Chuneola paradoxa 
Chuneola parasitica
Chuneola spinifera

References

Amphipoda